Zdeněk Nehoda (born 9 May 1952, in Hulín) is a former Czech football forward. At international level, he played for Czechoslovakia, making 91 appearances and scoring 31 goals, usually as a right-winger. He was a participant in the 1982 FIFA World Cup. He won a gold medal in the UEFA Euro 1976 and a bronze medal in the UEFA Euro 1980. He is currently an agent, representing a number of Czech and foreign players.

Honours

Club 
TJ Gottwaldov
Czechoslovak Cup: 1969–70

Dukla Prague
Czechoslovak First League: 1976–77, 1978–79, 1981–82
Czechoslovak Cup: 1980–81, 1982–83

International 
Czechoslovakia
European Football Championship: 1976

Individual 
Czechoslovak Footballer of the Year: 1978, 1979
UEFA European Championship Team of the Tournament: 1976

References

External links 
 
 Czech Footballer of the Year
 4th Highest International Goals
 15th in European Footballer of the Year
 9th in European Footballer of the Year
 27th in European Footballer of the Year
 World Cup The All-time World Cup Team

1952 births
Living people
People from Hulín
Czech footballers
Czechoslovak footballers
Dukla Prague footballers
FC Fastav Zlín players
Grenoble Foot 38 players
SV Darmstadt 98 players
Standard Liège players
2. Bundesliga players
1982 FIFA World Cup players
UEFA Euro 1976 players
UEFA Euro 1980 players
UEFA European Championship-winning players
Czechoslovakia international footballers
Czechoslovak expatriate footballers
Expatriate footballers in West Germany
Expatriate footballers in Belgium
Expatriate footballers in France
Czechoslovak expatriate sportspeople in West Germany
Czechoslovak expatriate sportspeople in Belgium
Czechoslovak expatriate sportspeople in France
Association football forwards
Sportspeople from the Zlín Region